Cape Kumukahi is the easternmost point of the Big Island of Hawaii. It constitutes the eastern end of the East Rift Zone of Kīlauea which is prolonged under the sea beyond the course via the edge of Puna.

Cape Kumukahi Light is located in the cape.

References

Kumukahi
Landforms of Hawaii (island)